Zenepos totolirata is a species of sea snail, a marine gastropod mollusk in the family Raphitomidae.

Description
The length of the shell attains 3.4 mm, its diameter 1.4 mm.

(Original description) The minute shell is narrowly fusiform, thin, semitransparent and spirally lirate. 

Sculpture : The protoconch is microscopically finely spirally striate, the succeeding whorls have 3 and the body whorl 10 to 12 equidistant fine spiral lirae. The interstices are smooth and slightly broader than the threads. 

The colour of the shell is white.

The spire is narrowly conical, measuring about 1½ times the height of the aperture. The protoconch consists of 1½ convex whorls, the nucleus is narrowly rounded and oblique. There are 4 to 5 subsequent whorls, regularly increasing, lightly convex and somewhat flattened below the suture. The base of the shell is slightly contracted. The suture is not much
impressed. The aperture is high and narrow, angled above, with a very short broad and truncated siphonal canal below. The outer lip is convex, straightened below the suture, with a very shallow broad sinus at the suture. It is smooth inside, crenated on the outside by spiral sculpture, thin and sharp.  The columella is vertical, straight, lightly excavated toward the flat parietal wall. The inner lip is very thin and narrow and smooth.

Distribution
This marine species is endemic to New Zealand and occurs off South Island.

References

 Suter, H. (1908a) Descriptions of new species of New Zealand marine shells. Proceedings of the Malacological Society of London, 8, 178–191, pl. 7.
 Powell, A.W.B. 1979 New Zealand Mollusca: Marine, Land and Freshwater Shells, Collins, Auckland
 Spencer, H.G., Marshall, B.A. & Willan, R.C. (2009). Checklist of New Zealand living Mollusca. Pp 196-219. in: Gordon, D.P. (ed.) New Zealand inventory of biodiversity. Volume one. Kingdom Animalia: Radiata, Lophotrochozoa, Deuterostomia. Canterbury University Press, Christchurch

External links
 Spencer H.G., Willan R.C., Marshall B.A. & Murray T.J. (2011). Checklist of the Recent Mollusca Recorded from the New Zealand Exclusive Economic Zone
 

totolirata
Gastropods described in 1908
Gastropods of New Zealand